State Route 615 (SR 615) is a  north–south state highway in the northeastern portion of the U.S. state of Ohio. SR 615 runs from its southern terminus at a signalized intersection with SR 306 in Kirtland to its northern terminus at a signalized intersection with SR 283 in Mentor-on-the-Lake.

Route description
The entirety of SR 615 exists within Lake County. The highway begins at a signalized intersection with SR 306 in Kirtland, and follows a portion of Chillicothe Road running northeast into Kirtland Hills until its intersection with Center Street.  It then turns to the north, intersecting Interstate 90 (I-90) at a diamond interchange as it passes into Mentor.  Continuing to the north, SR 615 crosses SR 84 and U.S. Route 20 (US 20).  After its junction with the SR 2 freeway at a diamond interchange, it stays on Center Street until the intersection with Munson Road.  Turning west on Munson, the route heads toward its northern terminus at a signalized intersection with SR 283 in Mentor-on-the-Lake.

No portion of SR 615 is included as a part of the National Highway System.

History
The SR 615 designation was established in 1937.  The highway has utilized essentially the same routing between SR 306 and SR 283 through Kirtland, Kirtland Hills and Mentor throughout its history. In 2001 the route at the southern end was realigned slightly north to accommodate the construction of Historic Kirtland Village; The Church of Jesus Christ of Latter-day Saints provided all funding for the reroute and related construction.

Prior to 2003, SR 615 traveled over I-90 in the southern end of Mentor without any direct connection.  Consequential to this portion of Lake County experiencing growth, on November 24, 2003,  a new interchange was opened linking SR 615 with the Interstate.

Major intersections

References

External links

615
Transportation in Lake County, Ohio